The men's discus throw event at the 1977 Summer Universiade was held at the Vasil Levski National Stadium in Sofia on 20 and 21 August.

Medalists

Results

Qualification

Final

References

Athletics at the 1977 Summer Universiade
1977